Art versus Nonart: Art out of Mind is a book by Professor Tsion Avital, published by Cambridge University Press in 2003 and translated and published in Chinese by The Commercial Press, Beijing  in 2009. In 2018 it was translated and published in Spanish by Vernon Press, Washington.

In the first part of the book (Chapters 1-4) Avital examines from various angles the question "Is modern art actually art?". In this section Avital analyzes and criticizes modern art, and claims that all non-figurative art created in the 20th century is not in fact art, but rather the shreds and raw materials of the figurative art that preceded it, or at best, trivial design.  Avital's  criticism is based on a new, general and coherent system of criteria  which anchors the nature of art and culture in the structural properties of mind. The discussion of the system of criteria takes up most of the second part of the book (chapters 5, 6,  8). In light of the new system of criteria he indicates the necessary conditions that any new paradigm for art of the future must fulfill in order to be really relevant to art. In the viewpoint presented in the book, modern art is only a chaotic interim stage between the art of the past which has already maximized its potential, and the art of the future which is not yet here, but whose outline can be identified. In contrast to most other researchers who reject modernism and decry the death of art, or propose to return to the art of the past, Avital's book rejects modernism but raises new hope, the possibility of a new and thrilling paradigm for art in the future.

A concise summary of the book

1.	In chapter one, Avital argues that many books and articles have pointed out various negative aspects of modernism. Avital's book claims that art is in much deeper trouble because it is in the first paradigmatic crisis in its history, which essentially resembles the first paradigmatic crisis in science in the 17th century transition from  Aristotelian to Galilean physics. In contrast to the common perception,

Avital does not blame the decline of figurative art on Impressionism, the camera or Cubism, but rather presents a completely different type of explanation. He writes of the intellectual revolutions and the deep and influential cultural processes which occurred in Western culture in the last five hundred and fifty years, which changed our way of thinking in a manner which is no longer compatible with the way of thinking which is visual, fundamental to figurative art, which therefore had to decline. Avital presents the radical thesis that non-figurative art is not art at all, but only a necessary intermediate stage between the art of the past and that of the future, while modernism itself is not art but rather the dismantling of the old art. Modernism is a very important phase in the history of art in the sense that the de-constructivist phase is a necessary and vital condition for art to make the transition from the level of abstraction and generalization it possessed in figurative art for 40,000 years to a new paradigm in the future which will be at a far higher level of abstraction and generalization.

2. The second chapter is dedicated entirely to confirmation of Avital's claim that the totality of modern art is based on a logical fallacy  which is common in nature and culture among human beings, animals of all levels and even plants. This failure is called the fallacy of affirming the consequence. This is a fallacy of biological origin, among the most important survival mechanisms of animals and of humans – the mechanism of disguise and camouflage. It serves both for defense and attack. It is a fallacy we all use, usually without being conscious of it, and we are all its victims when others use it to mislead us. An insect may look just like one of the leaves of the plant on which it lives until another insect approaches it and then the "leaf" devours it. A flower may look just like a female wasp, and the males coming to mate with "her" cause the flower to pollinate, and so on; there are countless examples. 	Avital argues that this fallacy is also the basis of all of modern art. It is true that a real painting is constructed of colors and forms, but the fact that something is made of colors and forms does not necessarily imply that it is a real painting. It is true that an important work of art deserves to be shown in a museum, but if something is shown in a museum, that does not necessarily imply that it is a work of art, and even less so, an important work. In Avital's view the artistic and commercial modern art establishment intentionally employs this fallacy in a particularly sophisticated manner in order to transform every bit of nonsense into a valuable art work. Avital calls this fallacy the "Duchamp syndrome," because Duchamp more than any other artist contributed to the reduction of art to banal reality, and thus nullified the distinction between the world of symbols and that of things. Avital claims that if one reduces a system of symbols to color and form, one reduces art to valueless graphic or industrial design.

3. In the third chapter, Avital presents a survey and analysis of the history of the concept of abstraction over 2300 years, and claims that the fathers of modernism erred completely in their understanding and usage of the term "abstraction." He claims that any art which is called "abstract art" is not abstract at all, because abstraction is a bidirectional act of the intellect. On one hand, abstraction contains elimination of the unique characteristics of each of the objects in a certain set of things, but on the other hand there is a preservation of the most important characteristics of that set of objects and their transformation to their common denominator, thus creating generalization. Since Kandinsky and Mondrian lacked knowledge of the significance and the history of the concept of abstraction, they treated only the aspect of elimination within abstraction, which is the literal meaning of the term in Latin, abstractio, but were completely unaware of the main part of the concept, that of generalization. That is, they created simplification instead of abstraction thus misleading all the artists that followed them. In view of this, it is understandable that the products of the art called "abstract," in both painting and sculpture, are not abstract at all. On the contrary, all these products are concrete instances of colors and forms for they contain no generalization at all. Therefore, in the best of cases, all paintings of modern art are elementary graphic art, and in the case of sculpture, all the works are examples of industrial design or architecture lacking any utilitarian value.

4. The fourth chapter criticizes certain conceptions or theories of aesthetics in the twentieth century, which in Avital's view only pretend to extend the concept of art, but in fact they serve the modern art establishment by fitting the definition of art to that which the establishment desires, in particular the art dealers. This chapter presents the claim that aesthetics has totally failed in its attempt to define art. The result of this failure is extreme vagueness which has been well exploited by so-called artists, the modern art establishment, and in particular the art dealers, in order to present and market anything as a work of art. In other words, Avital thinks that it is the aestheticians and art historians who are primarily responsible for the corruption of art in the twentieth century, for their role was either to define art so that it would be possible to distinguish art from non-art, or to admit that they were unable to do so, and so cannot give any theoretical justification to modernism as art. The seventh chapter completes the fourth, in the sense that it presents a fundamental and extensive refutation regarding the conventionalist viewpoint in aesthetics, whose damage to art as an area of culture is particularly great. This chapter directly and sharply attacks the theoreticians' responsibility for the crisis, and what he consider to be the  prostitution of art in the past hundred years.

5. The fifth chapter is the most important in the book, and it gives value and basis to all the other chapters. Many books rejected modernism in the past. But they all claimed that it is bad art in one way or another, while not one of them claimed, as does Avital, that it is not art. As a result, a state of extreme relativism arose both with regard to calling things art and with regard to the possibility of evaluating works of art. That which is a work of art to one person and even a masterpiece may appear to another irrelevant to art and lacking any cultural value, without the possibility of deciding between the two. The reason for this is that those who rejected modernism did not have any system of criteria to help them prove that these works were not art at all. Avital's book is different in that he presents a completely new system of criteria which, possibly for the first time, may provide a basis for distinguishing art from non-art, and thus redrawing the lines of demarcation between art and that which does not belong to art. Over many years of research Avital discovered that there are about ten cognitive meta-structures that appear in every work of figurative art from prehistory up to this day. He calls these meta-structures "mindprints", and sees them as the structural interface between mind and reality. That is, these are structures that the mind imprints on all products of culture, and so they are common to all areas of culture. Therefore, all areas of culture are different incarnations of the same fundamental structures. Below is a tentative table of mindprints.

A tentative table of mindprints:

1. Connectivity–Disconnectivity (Codis) (Unity–Plurality)

2. Open-Endedness–Closed-Endedness

3. Recursiveness (Recurrence)–Singularity (“One-off”)

4. Transformation–Invariance

5. Hierarchy–Randomness (Antihierarchy, Disorder)

6. Symmetry–Asymmetry

7. Negation–Affirmation (Double Negation)

8. Complementarity–Mutual Exclusiveness

9. Comparison-Non Comparison

10. Determinism–Indeterminism (Probability, Selection, Choice)

The different areas of culture implement these mindprints by means of various systems of verbal, conceptual, pictorial or formal symbols. These systems also differ in their level of abstraction and generalization. The uniqueness of figurative art is in its incarnation of mindprints by means of a system of pictorial symbols and aesthetic elements.

In Avital's article from 1998 "Footprints Literacy"

he presented a comparison between the reading of footprints by hominids about four million years ago, prehistoric art, modern science and modern art. The comparison shows that mindprints appear in all these areas except for modern art, where mindprints appear only partially and in a distorted or ruined form. In the other areas, mindprints appear at a level of abstraction which increases with the advance from prehistory to our own time. In other words, Avital anchors the nature of culture in general and that of art in particular in the nature of mind. Furthermore, he hints at the possibility that this system of mindprints is the basis for all general epistemology and ontology, and it seems to exist at all levels of being: physical, biological, social, noetic, at both macro and micro scales.

The fifth, sixth and eighth chapters respectively show how each of the mindprints, such as Connectivity-Disconnectivity,  Hierarchy-Randomness, Symmetry-Asymmetry,  enable one to distinguish art from non-art. For example, a painting depicting a horse presents a graphical common denominator between all horses of the same type. That is, on one hand the pictorial symbol of the horse relates all horses with the same visual characteristics, but it also separates the group of these horses from any other animal or object. In other words, Symmetry-Asymmetry is the principle of connectivity of figurative painting. The more detailed the painting of a horse, the more levels of organization or layering or hierarchy are contained in the painting. On the other hand, every such painting has very many random factors. That is, in painting a hierarchy is created of symbols, sub-symbols, sub-sub-symbols etc. Therefore, the hierarchy is the result of recursive connectivity, while the randomness is the result of recursive separation. The examples here are only three of the ten mindprints and they are sufficient for the point. In Avital's view, Hierarchy-Randomness suffices to distinguish art from pseudo-art. To put it simply, the difference between a real painting and a pseudo-painting is very similar to the difference between a cow and a hamburger. A living cow is a super-system which includes hundreds or thousands of subsystems, all dynamically interrelated directly or obliquely. This fact enables the cow to function as an organism. In contrast, a hamburger is the result of total destruction of all the systems which previously were the cow, and the destruction of all connections between them. This is the meaning of the death of the cow. Similarly, Avital argue that figurative art is a super-system of symbols, sub-symbols and sub-sub-symbols etc. The more detailed the painting, the more levels of organization it contains. In contrast, a painting called "Abstract Expressionist" is an arbitrary or random jumble of colors and forms. It contains no hierarchies, no symmetries with relation to any subject, and does not connect to anything other than its being smeared on canvas.

At the end of the book there is a ten-page summary table contrasting figurative and nonrepresentational art in light of about fifty characteristics that appear in figurative art but do not appear or appear in a distorted fashion in nonrepresentational art.

The book
Avital. T. (2003). Art versus Nonart : Art out of Mind. Cambridge University Press, Cambridge. (445 pages)
The book has been published in Chinese by The Commercial Press, Translated  by Wang Zuzhe, Beijing, 2009.
齐安·亚菲塔（Tsion Avital），2009年，《艺术对飞艺术》，北京：商务印书馆，译者王祖哲，山东大学文学院
The book has been published in Spanish: Arte vs. No-Arte: Arte fuera de la mente, Translated by Sandra Luz Patarroyo Rodríguez. Malaga; Vernon Press, 2018.

References 

2003 books
Philosophical literature
Cambridge University Press books